Eulophias is a  genus of marine ray-finned fish belonging to the family Eulophiidae, the spinous eelpouts. These fishes are found in the northwestern Pacific Ocean.

Species
Eulophias contains the following species:

References

Eulophiidae
Ray-finned fish genera